is a railway station on the Hokuriku Main Line in the city of Awara, Fukui Prefecture, Japan, operated by the West Japan Railway Company (JR West).

Lines

Station layout
The station consists of one unnumbered island platform connected by a footbridge. The station is unattended.

Platforms

History
The station opened on 20 September 1897. With the privatization of Japanese National Railways (JNR) on 1 April 1987, the station came under the control of JR West.

Passenger statistics
In fiscal 2016, the station was used by an average of 60 passengers daily (boarding passengers only).

Surrounding area
 Hosorogi Post Office

See also
 List of railway stations in Japan

References

External links

  

Railway stations in Fukui Prefecture
Stations of West Japan Railway Company
Railway stations in Japan opened in 1897
Hokuriku Main Line
Awara, Fukui